Besler may refer to:

People
 Basilius Besler (1561–1629), German apothecary and botanist
 George Besler ( ? - ? ), American steam power entrepreneur in the 1930s and 1940s, son of William George Besler 
 Matt Besler (b. 1987), American soccer player
 Peter Besler (b. 1963), American investment advisor and author
 William Besler ( ? - ? ), American steam power entrepreneur in the 1930s and 1940s, son of William George Besler 
 William George Besler (1865-1942), American railroad manager
 Igor Bezler (b. 1965), supposed pro-Russian rebel in Ukraine

Other
 Besler (mountain)

See also
 Bessler
 Beseler